"Last Night" is a single by the American hip hop duo Kid 'n Play, released in 1987 via Select Records. It is their first single as "Kid 'n Play" (previously songs were released under the name Fresh Force/The Fresh Force Crew). It was included on their debut album 2 Hype, released the following year. Produced by Hurby "Luv Bug" Azor, who also has writing credits for the song alongside the members of duo, in the song they narrate about an unfortunate double date.

It also became the duo's first song to appear on a major chart, reaching  71 on the UK Singles Chart in July of that year.

In 1999, Ego Trips editors ranked "Last Night" at  33 in their list of Hip Hop's 40 Greatest Singles by Year 1987 in Ego Trip's Book of Rap Lists.

Content and composition 
Produced by Hurby "Luv Bug" Azor, who also has writing credits for the song alongside the members of duo, in the song they narrate about an unfortunate double date.

Samples 
"Last Night" contains vocal samples from Esther Williams's "Last Night Changed It All (I Really Had a Ball)" and The Brothers Johnson's "Ain't We Funkin' Now", the bass from Cloud One's "Patty Duke" and drums from Dexter Wansel's "Theme from the Planets".

References

1987 songs
Kid 'n Play songs
Songs written by Hurby Azor